Peligro is the second studio album by Colombian singer-songwriter Shakira, released on 25 March 1993, by Sony Music Colombia.

Background
Author Ximena Diego wrote that "the first fifteen years of Shakira's life gave her a taste of how sweet stardom could be"; She was signed to Sony Music Colombia at the age of 13, with the deal being to record three albums, which were Magia, Peligro and Pies Descalzos. While Magia, her debut album, wasn't much of a success commercially, with only 1,200 copies sold, the songs from that record garnered frequent radio play on Colombian radio stations, and, according to Diego, showed her potential.

Despite Magia's lack of sales, Sony Colombia had higher expectations for Shakira's second album, hoping that it would heighten the small popularity she was already having. Diego wrote, however, that the time during the production and release of Peligro would prove that "the road of the artist was not an easy one." The several months of producing Peligro was one of Shakira's most frustrating periods in her career, resulting in an "odd album" that did not fare well with the singer.

Composition
The album features songs written by Shakira and other composers, including Eddie Sierra, who wrote "El Amor de Mi Vida" from Ricky Martin's self-titled debut album. The press release by Sony Colombia, who seem satisfied with the final product, described Peligro's lyrical content as "profound", "direct" and "filled with magic and poetry". Musically, the record has a "North American ballad treatment", with instrumentation of rock guitars, acoustic pianos and Kenny G-style saxophones.

Release and promotion 
The album's lead single, "Eres", was released on vinyl, but that is the only promotion the single had received. The second and final single off the album was "Tú Serás La Historia De Mi Vida". It was the only single off the record that had a music video. It was also included on Shakira's first tour "Tour Pies Descalzos," as well as the track "Magia" from her debut record Magia. Shakira was not pleased with the final result of Peligro, so much so that she decided not to promote the record. The magazine TVyNovelas said that she might've also asked for Sony not to handle promotion either. However, the label did send the album to a few radio stations, and the song "Tú Serás La Historia De Mi Vida" was played on some local stations several months later. But Shakira's lack of support resulted in the cancellation of rehearsals and live performances. While the record was a bit-more well-received from the public than Magia, it failed to live up to the expectations of Sony Colombia, with approximately 223 copies sold. Since the album is deleted from the music marketplace just like Magia, it is very difficult to find. Original copies of the album are sold between $200–1000 on major selling sites, such as eBay and Discogs, from time to time.

Shakira has stated that she refuses to allow the re-release of both Magia and Peligro, because of their "immaturity".

Track listing

Release history

References

Further reading

1993 albums
Shakira albums
Sony Music Colombia albums
Spanish-language albums
Promotional albums